Michael Cobbins (born August 9, 1992) is an American professional basketball player for Basket Brescia Leonessa of the Italian Lega Basket Serie A (LBA). He played college basketball for Oklahoma State.

High school career
Cobbins attended Palo Duro High School where, as a junior, he averaged 18.3 points and 10.5 rebounds per game, leading the Dons to the Region I-4A finals. In his senior season, he averaged 15.1 points and 9.7 rebounds per game, making him a consensus four-star recruit. He was ranked as the 12th-best power forward by Scout.com and the ninth-best power forward by Rivals.com, who also ranked him as the No. 38 player of the nation.

College career
After graduating Palo Duro, Cobbins attended Oklahoma State where he appeared in 105 games and averaged 5.8 points, 5.6 rebounds and 1.6 blocks in 25.4 minutes per game. He averaged 6.8 points, 5.9 rebounds and 1.8 blocks in his senior year. A two-time member of the Big 12 All-Defensive Team, Cobbins ranked second in the conference in blocks per game (1.83) during his senior season.

Professional career
After going undrafted in the 2015 NBA draft, Cobbins joined the Oklahoma City Thunder for the 2015 NBA Summer League. On October 22, 2015, he signed with the Thunder, but was waived two days later. On November 3, he was acquired by the Oklahoma City Blue as an affiliate player from the Thunder.

On July 19, 2016, Cobbins signed with the Greek club Apollon Patras.

On August 22, 2018, Cobbins was selected by the Capital City Go-Go of the G League in the 2018 expansion draft.

On September 11, 2018, he signed with Split.

For the 2019–20 season, Cobbins signed with the Capital City Go-Go of the NBA G League. He missed a game in December 2019 with an arm injury. Cobbins missed another game against the Westchester Knicks in January 2020 with an illness. On February 22, 2020, Cobbins contributed 16 points, eight rebounds and an assist in a win over the Greensboro Swarm.

In 2021 he played for Maccabi Haifa of the Israeli Basketball Premier League. While on July 26, 2021, he signed in Italy for Basket Brescia Leonessa.

The Basketball Tournament
Cobbins joined Stillwater Stars, composed of Oklahoma State alumni, in The Basketball Tournament 2020.

Personal life
The son of Dennis and Joy, Cobbins has two sisters, Kim and Jade. He graduated from Oklahoma State with a degree in university studies with an emphasis in entrepreneurship in May 2014.

References

External links
 Oklahoma State Cowboys bio
 RealGM profile
 USBasket profile
 Sports-Reference profile

1992 births
Living people
African-American basketball players
American expatriate basketball people in Croatia
American expatriate basketball people in Germany
American expatriate basketball people in Greece
American men's basketball players
Apollon Patras B.C. players
Basketball players from Texas
Capital City Go-Go players
KK Split players
Oklahoma City Blue players
Oklahoma State Cowboys basketball players
Power forwards (basketball)
S.Oliver Würzburg players
Sportspeople from Amarillo, Texas
21st-century African-American sportspeople